Calitzdorp is a town on the Western side of the Little or Klein Karoo in the Western Cape Province of South Africa and lies on South Africa's Route 62. 

The farm Buffelsvallei, on which Calitzdorp stands, was granted to Jacobus Johannes and Matthys Christiaan Calitz in 1831. The brothers donated part of their farm for the establishment of a church in 1853 and in 1858 the church started the sale of plots to church members. In 1924 a railway line was opened, in 1937 electrification and a new cement road to Oudtshoorn was completed.

The Swartberg (in the North), Rooiberge (to the South) and the Mountains of the Huisrivier Pass (to the West) surrounds Calitzdorp's challenging landscape with floods, droughts and extreme weather, from very hot to snow clad mountaintops in the winter.  

Summers are very hot during the day, mainly a dry heat, up to 40 °C. Wind from the sea every afternoon allows for moderate, cool evenings. Winters have sunny days, very cold nights with occasional frost and snow often falling on the surrounding Swartberg Mountain Range. Rainfall is approximately 200 mm per year, often with the changing of seasons. Prevailing winds are mainly from the south in summer and hot wind from the North in August.

Calitzdorp is a haven for enthusiasts of fishing, bird-watching, 4×4 and other scenic routes, horse-riding and wine tasting.

Calitzdorp is renowned as a centre of the port wine industry in South Africa with several major wine estates famous for their award-winning products. A Port festival takes place in the town in mid-June each year.

References

External links
 Dehandelshuis Beauty Salon & Coffee Bar, Calitzdorp
 Calitzdorp Info
 Calitzdorp Tourism Bureau
 Route 62
 Rose of the Karoo
 http://roseofthekaroo/wp/

Populated places in the Kannaland Local Municipality
Hot springs of South Africa